Shad Kam or Shadkam may refer to:
 Shadkam, Fars
 Shad Kam, Yazd